Samilan-e Bala (also Romanized as Samīlān-e Bālā; also known as Samīlān) is a village in Rudkhaneh Rural District, Rudkhaneh District, Rudan County, Hormozgan Province, Iran. At the 2006 census, its population was 188, in 40 families.

References 

Populated places in Rudan County